Chlorotrifluoroethylene (CTFE) is a chlorofluorocarbon with chemical formula CFCl=CF2. It is commonly used as a refrigerant in cryogenic applications. CTFE has a carbon-carbon double bond and so can be polymerized to form polychlorotrifluoroethylene or copolymerized to produce the plastic ECTFE.  PCTFE has the trade name Neoflon PCTFE from Daikin Industries in Japan, and it used to be produced under the trade name Kel-F from 3M Corporation in Minnesota.

Production and reactions
Chlorotrifluoroethylene is produced commercially by the dechlorination of 1,1,2-trichloro-1,2,2-trifluoroethane with zinc:
CFCl2-CF2Cl  +  Zn  →  CClF=CF2  +  ZnCl2
In 2012, an estimated 1–10 million pounds were produced commercially in the United States.

The thermal dimerization of chlorotrifluoroethylene gives 1,2-dichloro-1,2,3,3,4,4-hexafluorocyclobutane. Dichlorination of the latter gives hexafluorocyclobutene.  It undergoes [2+2] cycloaddition to vinyl acetate.

References

Heating, ventilation, and air conditioning
Organofluorides
Refrigerants